Roxana Halls (born 1974) is an English figurative painter known for her images of wayward women who refuse to conform to society’s expectations. She has been widely praised for her draughtsmanship, wry humour, and disturbing narratives. She lives with her wife in London.

Early life
Halls was born in Plaistow, London.

Growing up, she aspired to be an actress and her long-standing interest in drama and performance is evident in the baroque sensibility of many of her works. Halls has said that she often equates painting with performance and that her models collude with her in creating theatrical scenarios for which the viewer is invited to tease out narratives.

Describing herself as mainly self-taught, Halls took a foundation course in art at Plymouth College of Art and Design but found that she was very self-reliant. When she moved to London, she ‘just painted, worked hard, went to the National Gallery constantly and did it that way.’ She moved near a former theatre in south London where she established her first studio.

Career
Halls’s practice has relied on painting from life, memory, and photographs. Referencing everything from high art and philosophy to the zeitgeist (including, at different times, Charcot’s ‘The Iconographie Photographique de la Salpêtrière,’ Hélène Cixous’s écriture feminine, the war time paintings of Dame Laura Knight, Bosch’s The Garden of Earthly Delights, the songs of Nick Cave, Peaches and Robert Wyatt, Sylvia Plath, avantgarde cinema, and the fashion for glamorising the past), Halls’s paintings examine gender, class, identity and sexuality.
 A voracious researcher, Halls has claimed she is magpie-like, attracted by beautiful things but also by the discarded and careworn. She collects costumes - often foraged from charity or thrift shops - from different countries and periods, aware that the stories of their owners may remain forever unknowable.

Her paintings focus on the materiality of people’s lived environments, seducing the viewer with exquisite still lifes or her emphasis on fabrics and hair. Often domestic in scale and subject, they rebut the notion that grandiose history paintings are a better barometer of contemporary life. They ask: how is women’s behaviour policed by society and how do women internalise those expectations and limitations through self-surveillance?

Whilst her ‘Shadow Play’ and ‘Suspended Women’ series (2012) may recall the surrealism of artists like Dorothea Tanning or Meret Oppenheim, Halls does not consider her work surreal. However, performance, theatricality, illusion, and magic are recurring themes. Her exhibition ‘Roxana Halls’ Tingle-Tangle,’ produced for the National Theatre, London in 2009 borrowed the language of cabaret performance, Halls re-imaging herself as the impresario of a troupe. For her painting Terina The Paper Tearer and Inferna The Human Torch, she performed Inferna, a character she created after being inspired by a costume she found in a charity shop in Brixton. Whilst she used external performers for other works in the series, self-portraits have always been an important aspect of her oeuvre though Halls has stated that she rarely paints herself as herself. Halls allows paintings to evolve in the making rather than beginning with preparatory drawings. This mirrors her interest in depicting women in evolving states, in liminal states, held sometimes in suspension.

Halls has also explored consumption and abstinence, as in her 'Appetite' series (2013–14), where women transgress by not behaving as they are expected to: Halls shows one gorging on popcorn, eating with her mouth open (referencing, perhaps, the eighteenth century celebrity portraitist Elisabeth Vigée-LeBrun and her innovation of showing her teeth in her self-portraits – something that was considered uncouth or deemed the sign of a maniac; Halls paints the teeth last in her paintings). Inspired by Artemisia Gentileschi and Caravaggio’s versions of Judith and Holofernes, another woman (Halls again) takes over the traditionally male role in Carvery, 2013 where platters of working-class food teeter on the edge of this feast for one, much like the plate in Caravaggio’s Supper at Emmaus. She wields her implements, carving out her own place in the world.

One of Halls’s most renowned series - 'Laughing While' (2012 onwards) – depicts women engaged in more transgressive acts that interrogate encultured norms around femininity. These women are always active subjects — often breaking propriety just by eating messily (Laughing While Eating Yoghurt, 2017) or laughing out loud. Halls cites Cixous’s retelling of the Chinese general Sun Tse ‘who decapitates a group of women he is trying to train as soldiers, so disconcerted, so disgusted is he by their persistent laughter and refusal to take his orders seriously. This resonates with me deeply. Acts of political resistance come in many forms and when I paint images of women laughing, eating, reclining, reading or simply looking, I am always cognisant of the fact that the most seemingly innocuous actions can be subversive.’ In many of the images, the women’s ‘bad’ behaviour becomes less innocuous and tips towards making them a danger to others and possibly to themselves. They jilt, commit arson, vandalise, loot, maraud.

In 2020 Halls was invited to paint Portrait of Katie Tomkins, Mortuary & Post Mortem Services Manager by her colleague Natalie Miles-Kemp on behalf of West Hertfordshire Hospitals NHS Trust for what became a major lockdown art project in the UK during the global Covid pandemic: Portraits for NHS Heroes. conceived by Tom Croft.

Halls was also commissioned to make portraits for Katherine Parkinson’s play Sitting (filmed by BBC Arts & Avalon Productions for BBC Four as part of the Lights Up festival, April 2021). She and Parkinson were recorded in conversation at her London studio for BBC Radio 4's Only Artists.

Inspired by Artemisia Gentileschi’s Self-portrait as St. Catherine, Halls’s exhibition 'Crime Spree' (2021) examines the taboo subject of women and criminality.

Halls’s work is in myriad private and public collections, both in the U.K. and overseas. Besides solo exhibitions at Beaux Arts, Bath; Hay Hill, London; and at Reuben Colley Fine Art, Birmingham, her work has been shown in numerous group shows in the UK and US, including the BP Portrait Award at The National Portrait Gallery, London, The R.A. Summer Exhibition, The Royal Society of Portrait Painters, The Discerning Eye, The Ruth Borchard Self Portrait Competition. In 2004, Halls won the Villiers David Prize which enabled her to visit Berlin for the first time and make her 'Cabaret' series. In 2010, she won the Founder’s Purchase Prize at the ING Discerning Eye show and thus entered their collection. Her 2019 portrait of Scottish musician Horse McDonald was acquired for the permanent collection of the Scottish National Portrait Gallery. The portrait’s pose derived from an amalgam of all the live moments, mannerisms and movements, Halls witnessed in her studio while Horse performed her best-loved song “Careful,” for her live and a cappella; the pose was the one Halls felt best encapsulated her sitter.

In 2020 Halls became a founder-member and later Director of InFems Art Collective. and created her first NFT "Pulse Points" in 2022 as part of 'Nightclubbing' - InFems's collaboration with Carolina Herrera.

In 2022 Halls featured on Episode 1 of BBC's Extraordinary Portraits hosted by Tinie Tempah where she was commissioned to paint twin sisters who survived a crocodile attack in Mexico.
Also in 2022, Halls' portrait of Katie Tomkins - Mortuary & Post Mortem Services Manager at West Hertfordshire NHS Trust was acquired for the permanent collection of the Science Museum, London, UK as part of their COVID-19 Collecting Project.

Halls was commissioned to create the Stretching Room paintings for Disney's film Haunted Mansion scheduled for release in Summer 2023. The works are now in the Disney Archive.

Selected works
Beauty Queen 2014 
Threesome II (Self-Portrait) 2018 
Terina the Paper Tearer & Inferna the Human Torch 2009
Laughing While Eating Salad 2013
Girt & Ina van Elben's Tingel Tangel Machine 2007
Girl Table 2014
Laughing While Leaving
A Little Light Reading 2012
Carvery 2013
Emma 2010

References

External links
Roxana Halls website 
Interview on Costume
Interview on Appetite
Interview on Tingle-Tangle

1974 births
Living people
20th-century English women artists
21st-century English women artists
Artists from London
English women painters
Feminist artists
People from Plaistow, Newham